The Bengal Nagpur Railway class HSG was a class of two 2-8-0+0-8-2 Garratt locomotives.

After North Western State Railway's GAS class, the Bengal Nagpur Railway conducted similar experiments for pulling heavier trains up the ghats with successful results. Its parts were similar to BESA heavy goods 2-8-0s. They worked on the Chakradharpur-Jharsuguda section coupled to each other. After electrification they became obsolete. In the end, they were stationed at Kharagpur workshops. They were the first successful class of Garratts.

Technical specifications

References

5 ft 6 in gauge locomotives
Beyer, Peacock locomotives
Steam locomotives of India
Garratt locomotives
2-8-0+0-8-2 locomotives